Protomachus may refer to:

Protomachus (Athenian general)
Protomachus (Macedonian general)